The 1952 Philadelphia Athletics season saw the A's finish fourth in the American League with a record of 79 wins and 75 losses. They finished 16 games behind the eventual World Series Champion New York Yankees. The Athletics' 1952 campaign would be their final winning season in Philadelphia; it would also be their only winning season of the 1950s. The Athletics would have to wait until 1968, their first season in Oakland, for their next winning record.

Offseason 
 January 21, 1952: Wally Moses was released by the Athletics.

Regular season 
The Athletics improved 9 games from their 70–84 record in 1951 and improved to 4th in the American League.  A Most Valuable Player season was turned in by left-handed pitcher Bobby Shantz and the A.L. batting championship was won by Ferris Fain with a .320 batting average.

Gus Zernial hit 29 home runs and drove in 100 RBI while Eddie Joost chipped in 20 HRs and 75 RBI. However, outside Bobby Shantz, who went 24–7, their best pitcher record-wise was Harry Byrd, with a 15–15 record. They finished 16 games behind the New York Yankees. This would also be the last time that the Athletics would finish with a winning record until 1968, when the team began playing in Oakland.

Season standings

Record vs. opponents

Notable transactions 
 May 10, 1952: Marion Fricano was purchased by the Athletics from the Brooklyn Dodgers.

Roster

Player stats

Batting

Starters by position 
Note: Pos = Position; G = Games played; AB = At bats; H = Hits; Avg. = Batting average; HR = Home runs; RBI = Runs batted in

Other batters 
Note: G = Games played; AB = At bats; H = Hits; Avg. = Batting average; HR = Home runs; RBI = Runs batted in

Pitching

Starting pitchers 
Note: G = Games pitched; IP = Innings pitched; W = Wins; L = Losses; ERA = Earned run average; SO = Strikeouts

Other pitchers 
Note: G = Games pitched; IP = Innings pitched; W = Wins; L = Losses; ERA = Earned run average; SO = Strikeouts

Relief pitchers 
Note: G = Games pitched; W = Wins; L = Losses; SV = Saves; ERA = Earned run average; SO = Strikeouts

Awards and honors 
 Bobby Shantz, American League MVP

Farm system

References

External links
1952 Philadelphia Athletics team page at Baseball Reference
1952 Philadelphia Athletics team page at www.baseball-almanac.com

Oakland Athletics seasons
Philadelphia Athletics season
Oak